Scooby-Doo! Pirates Ahoy! is a 2006 direct-to-DVD animated comedy mystery adventure film, and the tenth in a series of direct-to-video animated films based on the Scooby-Doo Saturday morning cartoons. It was released on September 19, 2006, and it was produced by Warner Bros. Animation, though it featured a logo for and copyright to Hanna-Barbera Cartoons at the end. It features the Mystery, Inc. gang travelling to the Bermuda Triangle on an eerie cruise, with ghosts, pirates, and monsters.

Plot
While making a star map in the Bermuda Triangle, astrophotographer, Rupert Garcia's ship is attacked by ghost pirates. Though he manages to hide from them, the pirates sink his ship and leave him lost at sea.
 
Fred is treating the Mystery Inc. gang to share in his birthday present: a mystery cruise, compliments of his parents Skip and Peggy. While preparing for the ship launch, Scooby and Shaggy have a creepy encounter with a sinister-looking cloaked man, whom the duo are sure is up to no good. The gang meet the hyper Cruise Director, Sunny St. Cloud, and the captain, Captain Crothers. The Captain says they are bound for the Bermuda Triangle, and St. Cloud promises some creepy intrigue. A montage of sloppy "mysteries" that are staged by St. Cloud and Captain Crothers follow, which the gang solves with ease. This peeves the other guests, who have no mysteries to solve now. Soon they rescue Rupert Garcia floating in the sea, who tells them of his encounter with the ghost pirates. The gang naturally assumes that this is a setup to another mystery and the crew believes he is delusional from being out at sea. He is taken below deck as a man in a jet-pack appears from the sky and lands on deck. He turns out to be Biff Wellington, an English billionaire who is known to be fun-loving yet eccentric who is trying to set a world record by Jeck packing around the world. He plans to stay on the ship as well until he can refuel.

That night, the gang attends a costume party dinner. The creepy cloaked man appears on stage, who turns out to be Mister Mysterio, a famous hypnotist. Shaggy and Scooby are picked from the audience to demonstrate his powers, but they prove immune to his hypnotism: yet the audience falls under the trance. Mysterio dispels the hypnotism and disappears in a puff of smoke. The ghost pirates led by Captain Skunkbeard and his first mate Wally attack the cruise ship and, wreak havoc, chasing the cruise guests, whom all mysteriously disappear. Skip and Peggy are kidnapped, and the pirates retreat back to the galleon and leave (after sinking the cruise ship). At this time, the gang realizes it is a real mystery, and they and Rupert are the only ones left aboard the damaged ship.

With his Rupert's help, they follow the glowing trail left behind by the galleon and arrive in a secret harbor. There, they find Rupert's old ship, and then are captured by the ghost pirates, who take them aboard their galleon. The pirates are looking to find a meteor of mystic power, said to be the source of the Triangle's power, which fell into the triangle 200 years ago and could be pinpointed using Rupert's antique painting and his skills as an astrophotographer. The gang is tied to the mast along with Skip, but there are no other cruise guests around.

The galleon enters the heart of the triangle, and begins to see past ghosts from the triangle: The Flight 19, USS Cyclops, even a sea serpent. Amidst this, the gang manages to escape and explore below deck. They find a lot of modern equipment that was  used to project the ghostly images just witnessed. The ship enters an odd ring of rocks, and pulls up the meteor, which glows golden yellow.

The gang then engineer a trap, which fails. The pirates then attempt to re-capture the gang, leading to a trademark Scooby-Doo chase sequence, in which the entire pirate crew are captured by Scooby and Shaggy. Captain Skunkbeard is revealed to be Wellington, and Wally is revealed to be Mysterio. The rest of the pirates turn out to be the cruise guests, Rupert's shipmates, and past conquests of the pirates. Wellington explains that Mysterio convinced him that he was the reincarnation of a pirate years ago, and could use the meteor to teleport back in time. Mysterio used this ruse to get Wellington to finance the search for the meteor. The crew were just hypnosis victims under Mysterio's power. Mysterio's true motive was that the meteor itself is pure gold and he was going to steal it to make himself rich, but then he is stopped by Scooby.

At this time, a volcanic reaction hits, and the gang deduces the forces of the triangle want the meteor back, so they drop it back in the water, and some steering by Fred narrowly gets the galleon out of the ring as it crumbles into the sea. The cruise guests use the galleon as a large party boat as they sail back to Miami to drop off the villains to the authorities.

Voice cast
 Casey Kasem as Norville "Shaggy" Rogers
 Frank Welker as Fred Jones, Scooby-Doo
 Mindy Cohn as Velma Dinkley
 Grey DeLisle as Daphne Blake
 Ron Perlman as Captain Skunkbeard/Biff Wellington
 Freddy Rodriguez as Rupert Garcia
 Tim Conway as Skip Jones
 Edie McClurg as Peggy Jones/Sea Salt Sally
 Kathy Najimy as Sunny St. Cloud
 Arsenio Hall as Captain Crothers
 Dan Castellaneta as Woodenleg Wally/Mr. Mysterio

References

External links

 
 

2006 animated films
2006 films
2006 direct-to-video films
2000s American animated films
Pirate films
American mystery films
Warner Bros. Animation animated films
Warner Bros. direct-to-video animated films
Scooby-Doo direct-to-video animated films
Films set in the Bermuda Triangle
American children's animated comedy films
2000s children's animated films
American children's animated mystery films
2000s English-language films
Films set on cruise ships